The 2013 JAF Grand Prix Fuji Sprint Cup was the final racing event for both the 2013 Super GT season and the 2013 Super Formula season. It took place over November 23 and November 24, 2013 at the Fuji Speedway in Oyama, Shizuoka, Japan.

Background
The JAF Grand Prix would be the last time the current model GT500 and the current model Super Formula cars would race, as Super GT would move to unified regulations with the Deutsche Tourenwagen Masters, while the Swift SF13 would be replaced by the Dallara SF14 for the 2014 Super Formula season.

The Balance of Performance in GT300 was once again adjusted, the GTA decided to adopt the balance of performance for GT3 cars from the Blancpain Endurance Series.

Unlike the eight points-scoring races in Super GT, the Fuji Sprint Cup was run under slightly different rules. 
 The GT500 and GT300 classes were split into their own set of two races.
 Each driver in GT500 and GT300 would have their own 22 lap (100 km) sprint race without any mandatory pitstop.
 Standing starts were also implemented for each of the four races instead of the rolling start normally seen.
 There would be no weight ballast for any of the cars in either class.

38 cars were entered in the two Super GT classes, 15 in GT500 and 23 in GT300. The #96 Dijon Racing Callaway Corvette Z06.R GT3 returning to the series after having last raced in the 2013 Fuji GT 300km, while the #35 Nismo Global Athlete Team made its only appearance of the season, with Alex Buncombe and Lucas Ordóñez driving. Neither the #52 OKINAWA-IMP RACING with SHIFT Mercedes-Benz SLS AMG GT3 or the #87 JLOC Lamborghini Gallardo GT3 were entered for the JAF Grand Prix, however JLOC put Hideki Yamauchi and Hiroki Yoshimoto, the drivers of the #87 car into their #88 car.

In Super Formula with the exception of André Lotterer and Loïc Duval returning to the cars they had driven for part of the season, there were no other driver changes.

Results

GT300 Race 1 results
The first GT300 race was held on November 23, 2013. Race result is as follows.

Fastest Lap – Alex Buncombe, #35 Nismo Athlete Global Team Nissan GT-R GT3 – 1:38.438

GT500 Race 1 results
The first GT500 race was held on November 23, 2013. Race result is as follows.

Fastest Lap – Yuji Kunimoto, #6 Lexus Team LeMans ENEOS Lexus SC430 – 1:32.847

Super Formula results
The Super Formula race was held on November 24, 2013. Race result is as follows.

Fastest Lap – Takuya Izawa, #40 Docomo Team Dandelion Racing – 1:25.043

GT300 Race 2 results
The second GT300 race was held on November 23, 2013. Race result is as follows.

Fastest Lap – Kazuki Hoshino, #3 NDDP Racing Nissan GT-R GT3 – 1:38.432

GT500 Race 2 results
The second GT500 race was held on November 23, 2013. Race result is as follows.

Fastest Lap – Kazuya Oshima, #6 Lexus Team LeMans ENEOS Lexus SC430 – 1:32.627

JAF Grand Prix point rankings

References

External links
Super GT official website 
Japanese Championship Super Formula official website 

JAF Grand Prix